Llewellyn David Morgan (7 March 1905 – 1979) was a Welsh professional footballer who played as a centre half or right half. He made nearly 250 appearances in the Football League, of which 192 were for Walsall.

Career
Morgan was born in Aberdare. He spent his early career with Merthyr Town and Aberdare & Aberaman Athletic before making his Football League debut for Charlton Athletic, for whom he made 40 league appearances. He joined Bradford City in June 1932, making 1 league appearance for the club. He left the club in June 1933 to join Aldershot, and later played for Walsall, for whom he made 192 league appearances and scored his only goal at Football League level.

Sources

References

1905 births
1979 deaths
Welsh footballers
Association football wing halves
Merthyr Town F.C. players
Aberdare Athletic F.C. players
Charlton Athletic F.C. players
Bradford City A.F.C. players
Aldershot F.C. players
Walsall F.C. players
English Football League players